Cihan Amasyalı (born May 19, 1983) is a Turkish professional basketball player who plays as a shooting guard for Mondi Melikşah Üniversitesi of the Turkish Basketball 1. League.

External links
Cihan Amasyalı FIBA Profile
Cihan Amasyalı TBLStat.net Profile
Cihan Amasyalı Eurobasket Profile
Cihan Amasyalı TBL Profile

1983 births
Living people
Basketball players from Istanbul
Turkish men's basketball players
Guards (basketball)